Pseudophoxinus antalyae, also known as the Antalya minnow or  Antalya spring minnow, is a species of ray-finned fish in the family Cyprinidae.
It is found only in Turkey.
Its natural habitats are rivers and intermittent rivers.
It is threatened by habitat loss.

References

Pseudophoxinus
Endemic fauna of Turkey
Fish described in 1992
Taxonomy articles created by Polbot